This is a categorized list of notable onion services (formerly, hidden services) accessible through the Tor anonymity network. Defunct services and those accessed by deprecated v2 addresses are marked.

Archive and Index 

 archive.today - Is a web archiving site, founded in 2012, that saves snapshots on demand 
 Demonoid - Torrent

 Sci-Hub – Search engine which bypasses paywalls to provide free access to scientific and academic research papers and articles
 KickassTorrents (defunct) – A BitTorrent index
 The Pirate Bay – A BitTorrent index
 Z-Library – Many instances exist

Commerce 

 Agora (defunct)
 AlphaBay - active again
 Atlantis (defunct)
 Black Market Reloaded (defunct)
 Dream Market (defunct)
 Evolution (defunct)
 Hansa (defunct)
 Sheep Marketplace (defunct)
 Silk Road (defunct)
 The Farmer's Market (defunct)
 TheRealDeal (defunct)
 Utopia (defunct)

Communications 

 OpenPGP

Messaging 

 Briar (software) – uses onion services as address when message transport is internet
 Cryptocat(defunct)
 Keybase
 Ricochet (software) - uses tor network by default for message sending and receiving
 TorChat (defunct)

Email providers

 Bitmessage.ch (defunct)
 Guerrilla Mail
 Proton Mail
 Riseup
 SIGAINT (defunct)
 Tor Mail (defunct)

Events 

 Debian Conference
 DEF CON

File storage 

 ProtonDrive
 Freedom Hosting (defunct) – Formerly the largest Tor-specific web host, until the arrest of its owner in August 2013.

Financial 

 Blockchain.info (v2)– A popular bitcoin blockchain explorer service
 Helix (defunct)

Government

 Central Intelligence Agency
 National Police and Public Prosecution Service of the Netherlands – An official hidden service about darknet market takedown operations

Hidden services directories, portals, and information 

 1.1.1.1 - DNS by Cloudflare
 The Hidden Wiki – ambiguously forked
 Darknet Wiki

News, index and document archives 

 BBC News
 BuggedPlanet(v2)
 BuzzFeed News(v2)
 Current Time TV
 DeepDotWeb (defunct)
 Deutsche Welle
 Die Tageszeitung – German daily
 Doxbin (defunct)
 It's Going Down
 ProPublica
 Radio Free Asia(v2)
 Radio Free Europe/Radio Liberty
 The Guardian
 The New York Times

Operating systems 

Debian (static Web content and package repositories)
DivestOS - Security and privacy-focused LineageOS fork.
 Qubes OS – Security-focused desktop operating system
 Whonix – Debian-based security distribution

Whistleblowing / Drop sites 

SecureDrop and GlobaLeaks software is used in most of these whistleblowing sites. These are a secure communications platform for use between journalists and sources. Both software's website is also available as an onion service. Websites that use secure drop are listed in a directory.
 2600: The Hacker Quarterly
 ABC News
 Aftenposten
 Al Jazeera Media Network
 Bloomberg News and Bloomberg Law
 CBC News
 CNN International
 Dagbladet
 Financial Times
 Forbidden Stories
 HuffPost
 Lawrence Lessig
 NRK
 Politico
 Reuters
 Süddeutsche Zeitung
 TechCrunch
 Independent Media Center
 The Globe and Mail
 The Washington Post
 Toronto Star
 TV 2 (Denmark)
 Vice Media
 Whistleblower Aid
 Filtrala – A Spanish whistleblowing initiative operated by Associated Whistleblowing Press
 Ljost – An Icelandic whistleblowing initiative operated by Associated Whistleblowing Press
 Die Tageszeitung – German daily
 NawaatLeaks – An Arabic whistleblowing initiative operated by Nawaat
 ProPublica
The Guardian
 The Intercept
 The Markup
New York Times
The New Yorker
 WildLeaks – A wildlife-crime whistleblowing initiative operated by Elephant Action League
 WikiLeaks

Nonprofit organizations 

 Courage Foundation
 Forbidden Stories
 Freedom of the Press Foundation
 Front Line Defenders
 La Quadrature du Net(v2)
 Privacy International
 Telecomix(v2, defunct)
 The Tor Project

Pornography 

 Boystown (defunct)
 Childs Play (defunct)
 Lolita City (defunct)
 Playpen (defunct)
 Welcome to Video (defunct)
 Pornhub

Search engines 

 Ahmia – Search engine
 Brave Search
 BTDigg(defunct)
 DuckDuckGo
 Grams (defunct)
 MetaGer
 Searx - Individual instances use onion address

Social media and forums 

 8chan – An imageboard
 Dark0de (defunct)
 Dread
 Facebook onion address – Facebook
 HackBB (defunct)
 Reddit
 Russian Anonymous Marketplace (defunct)
 The Daily Stormer – American neo-Nazi commentary- and message board
 The Hub(defunct)
 Tor Carding Forum (defunct)
 Twitter (defunct)

Software 

 Brave
 Guardian Project
 Mailpile(v2)

See also 

 Darknet
 Tor2web – Clearnet-to-hidden-service software

References

Note 

 To access onion links the .onion may be replaced with "tor2web.io". However it's strongly recommended to use official Tor Browser or Onion Browser to browse these links.

External links 
 
 
 Real-World Onion Sites on GitHub

Tor onion services
Tor hidden services
Tor (anonymity network), hidden services
Tor (anonymity network), hidden services